The 1952–53 Rugby Football League season was the 58th season of rugby league football.

Season summary
St. Helens won their second Rugby Football League Championship when they beat Halifax 24-14 in the play-off final.  They also ended the regular season as league leaders.

The Challenge Cup Winners were Huddersfield who beat St. Helens 15-10 in the final.

Cardiff dropped out of the league.

St. Helens won the Lancashire League, and Halifax won the Yorkshire League. Leigh beat St. Helens 22–5 to win the Lancashire County Cup, and Huddersfield beat Batley 18–8 to win the Yorkshire County Cup.

Championship

Play-off

Challenge Cup

A club record 69,429 people watch the Challenge Cup 3rd Round tie at Odsal between Bradford Northern and Huddersfield. Larger crowds had watched matches at Odsal, but this was the largest involving the home side.

In the Final, Huddersfield beat St. Helens 15-10 at Wembley in front of a crowd of 89,588. This produced a record gate taking for a Challenge Cup final of £31,000.

This was Huddersfield’s sixth Cup Final win in seven Final appearances, including one win during the Second World War. Peter Ramsden, their stand-off half, became the youngest player to win the Lance Todd Trophy for man-of-the-match at 19. the Huddersfield team also featured Australian Pat Devery and New Zealand's Peter Henderson.

References

Sources
1952-53 Rugby Football League season at Wigan.rlfans.com
The Challenge Cup at The Rugby Football League website

1952 in English rugby league
1953 in English rugby league
Northern Rugby Football League seasons